William Chrisman High School is a high school located in Independence, Missouri, United States, as part of the Independence School District.

History
The school was founded in 1888 and was known as Independence High School.  The first building was located at the intersection of Pleasant and Truman Road, the current location of the Palmer/Central Office Building.  It is from this location that President Harry S. Truman, First Lady Bess Truman, and Truman White House Press Secretary and Pulitzer Prize winner Charles Griffith Ross graduated in 1901.

In 1917 the Independence School District passed a levy and bond to build a new high school building.  Margaret Chrisman Swope offered to sell the district land for the new school at the southeast corner of Union and Maple for $1 in exchange for naming the school after her father, William Chrisman.  Chrisman had served as a member of the first school board in 1866 and was also a prominent lawyer and banker in the community.  The new building opened in 1918 as William Chrisman High School.  The high school moved to its current site in 1956, at the northeast corner of Noland Road and U.S. Route 24 (Independence Avenue), when a major addition was added to Ott Elementary School and the building was converted into the high school.  Since that time the building has undergone numerous additions.

Demographics
William Chrisman is home to 1,491 students from Independence, Missouri, and part of Sugar Creek, Missouri, (as of the beginning of the 2013-2014 school year).  The student population's racial breakdown is: 72.5% white, 12.6% black, 9.1% Hispanic, 0.7% Asian, and 0.3% Native American.

Extracurricular

Sports and activities
William Chrisman is a member of the Suburban Kansas City- White, a division of the Greater Kansas City Suburban Conference League, which realigns/changes every two years. Consisting of high schools: William Chrisman, Oak Park, Raytown, Fort Osage, Liberty North, and Staley William Chrisman also plays Truman, and Van Horn, which are also part of the Independence School District.

The William Chrisman Bears compete in the following sports:

Fall
Boys: cross country, football, soccer, swimming
Girls: volleyball, cross country, golf, softball, tennis, dance, cheer 
Winter
Boys: basketball, wrestling
Girls: basketball, swimming, dance, cheer
Spring
Boys: baseball, golf, tennis, track & field
Girls: soccer, track & field

Robotics
The school district's FIRST Robotics Competition team, Team 1723 the FBI (First Bots of Independence), was founded in 2006. The student members from all three ISD high schools meet almost all year round at William Chrisman High school. The FBI is also active in the ISD community; many members from the team mentor ISD middle school and elementary school FIRST Lego League teams and host an annual FIRST Lego League tournament at George Caleb Bingham Middle School.

Notable alumni 
 Madisen Ward - musician, Madisen Ward and The Mama Bearn
Forrest "Phog" Allen - KU basketball coach
 Don Buschhorn - former MLB player (Kansas City Athletics)
 Mort Cooper - former MLB player (St. Louis Cardinals, Boston Braves, New York Giants, Chicago Cubs)
 Walker Cooper - former MLB player (St. Louis Cardinals, New York Giants, Boston Braves, Pittsburgh Pirates, Chicago Cubs)
 Paul Henning - TV producer (The Beverly Hillbillies, Petticoat Junction, Green Acres)
 Jared Huffman - US Congressman, CA Dist 2
 Sharon Kinne - Serial Killer, One of the longest fugitives in American history
 Russ Morman - former MLB player (Florida Marlins, Chicago White Sox, Kansas City Royals); and current hitting coach for the Fresno Grizzlies
 Paul C. Nagel - historian and biographer
 Charles Ross - White House Press Secretary/Pulitzer Prize Winning Journalist
 Ellis Short - billionaire investor
 Tava Smiley - TV actress
 Orvar Swenson - pediatric surgeon
 Bess Wallace Truman - former First Lady of the United States
 Harry S. Truman - 33rd President of the United States

References

Buildings and structures in Independence, Missouri
Educational institutions established in 1888
1888 establishments in Missouri
High schools in Jackson County, Missouri
Public high schools in Missouri